144 may refer to:

 144 (number), the natural number following 143 and preceding 145
 AD 144, a year of the Julian calendar, in the second century AD
 144 BC, a year of the pre-Julian Roman calendar
 144 (film), a 2015 Indian comedy
 144 (video game), working title of The Path, a psychological horror art game
 144 (New Jersey bus), a bus route in New Jersey, USA
 Volvo 144, the main 4-door sedan model of the Volvo 140 Series
 Worcestershire bus route 144

See also
 List of highways numbered 144